Keryn McMaster (born 19 September 1993) is a New Zealand-born Australian swimmer.

She competed at the 2015 World Aquatics Championships and at the 2016 Summer Olympics in Rio de Janeiro.

See also
 List of Commonwealth Games medallists in swimming (women)

References

External links
 
 
 
 
 

1993 births
Living people
Australian female medley swimmers
Olympic swimmers of Australia
Swimmers at the 2016 Summer Olympics
Commonwealth Games medallists in swimming
Commonwealth Games bronze medallists for Australia
Swimmers at the 2014 Commonwealth Games
People from Auckland
People educated at John Paul College (Brisbane)
21st-century Australian women
Medallists at the 2014 Commonwealth Games